The Battle of Brownsville took place on November 2–6, 1863 during the American Civil War.  It was a successful effort on behalf of the Union Army to disrupt Confederate blockade runners along the Gulf Coast in Texas.  The Union assault precipitated the capture of Matamoros by a force of Mexican patriots, led by exiled officers living in Brownsville.

Background
During the first half of the war, the Union Navy had successfully blockaded many Southern ports along the Gulf Coast.  Cotton trade was a major economic asset for Texas and the whole Confederacy.  Initially cotton was transported to Brazos Santiago Pass at the delta of the Rio Grande and exported from Port Isabel.  Union forces captured this port and trade was moved inland to Brownsville, Texas.  From Brownsville goods were transported across the border to Matamoros and from there to neutral ports along the Mexican coast.

The U.S. government was also anxious to show Union presence along the Mexican border since the French army had just invaded Mexico and installed Maximillian as emperor.  Following the Union debacle at the second Battle of Sabine Pass, the U.S. government demanded General Nathaniel P. Banks, commanding the Department of the Gulf, to make another attempt at invading Texas.

Battle
Nathaniel Banks assembled 6,000 soldiers from three brigades in Napoleon J. T. Dana's XIII Corps.  The Confederate forces in the area were commanded by General Hamilton P. Bee.  Bee's forces consisted of a mere 4 companies from the 33rd Texas Cavalry under Colonel James Duff and another 2 companies of 3 month volunteers.  All other Confederates along the coast had been called elsewhere in the wake of the Union attack at Sabine Pass.  The total Confederate force amounted to roughly 150 men stationed at Fort Brown.  One company of volunteers under Captain Adrian I. Vidal defected, killing a private and wounding another from the 33rd Texas.

Banks landed the expedition at the mouth of the Rio Grande on November 2, 1863.  Bee dispatched two companies of his cavalry to observe and report on the Union landing.  Company A under Captain Richard Taylor arrived at the mouth of the Rio Grande while company F under Captain Henry Davis arrived at Point Isabel further north.  On November 2 Captain Taylor informed General Bee the Union forces had landed cavalry while Bee made preparatory orders for the evacuation of Brownsville.  Colonel William M. Dye's brigade led the Union advance.  After chasing off Taylor's Confederate cavalry, Dye's men entered the Brownsville around 10:00am on November 6, 1863. General Bee quickly ordered the evacuation of the city and abandoned Fort Brown.  He personally supervised the burning of what military supplies and cotton he could.  Inside the fort was 8,000 pounds of condemned explosives which caused a great explosion much to the terror of the local citizens.

The Confederates' destruction spread into the city while the soldiers resorted to looting prompting the local citizens into a degree of opposition.  A local resident by the name of General José Maria Cobos was a Mexican general and refugee living in exile due to the recent French invasion.  General Cobos received permission from the civilian authorities in Brownsville to organize a force to resist the looters and subdue the fires started by the Confederate evacuation.

Around noon General Banks personally arrived in the city and by 4:00pm the remaining Union forces arrived.  Colonel Dye was put in command of the post and the Union army encamped in the city, the army barracks at Fort Brown having been destroyed. The Union forces also captured a large supply of cotton left behind by the Confederates.

Aftermath
The loss of Brownsville significantly disrupted Confederate cotton trade.  The new trade route into Mexico lay roughly 300 miles northwest.  Brownsville provided a base for further Union operations against Mustang Island and Fort Esperanza up the Texas coast.  General Cobos took his vigilante force across the border and seized control of Matamoros.  There he continued to be of concern to General Banks.

Confederate forces made an attempt to recapture Brownsville in 1864. Colonel John S. "Rip" Ford assembled a large force of cavalry, but on July 30, 1864 Ford found the new Union commander, Francis J. Herron, had already abandoned Brownsville. The Confederates were able to reoccupy the city without a fight.

Forces

Union Department of the Gulf

Maj Gen Nathaniel P. Banks

XIII Corps
Maj Gen Napoleon J. T. Dana

Confederate District of Texas, New Mexico & Arizona
Maj Gen John B. Magruder

1st Division - Brigadier General Hamilton P. Bee
 33rd Texas Cavalry - Colonel James Duff
Company A - Cpt Richard Taylor
Company B
Company E
Company F - Cpt Henry T. Davis
 Vidal's Volunteer Company - Cpt Adrian I. Vidal (deserted)
 Cummings Volunteer Company

Sources

1863 in Texas
Brownsville
Cameron County, Texas
Brownsville
Brownsville
Brownsville
November 1863 events